The Radford Highlanders women's soccer team is an intercollegiate varsity sports team of Radford University. The team is a member of the Big South Conference of the National Collegiate Athletic Association.

Roster 
As of 2012

Team management 

Current Coaching Staff

Accomplishments
Highlander players hold a number of Big South records, most notably for the current goalie Che' Brown (2010–present) who holds the records for goals against average (0.65), saves percentage (.874) and highest winning percentage (.726). Sue Williams (1992) holds the record for most assists per game (1.00).

References 

http://www.ruhighlanders.com/index.aspx?path=wsoc&tab=1
http://www.bigsouthsports.com/ViewArticle.dbml?DB_OEM_ID=4800&ATCLID=205436672

External links 

 
Big South Conference women's soccer
Soccer clubs in Virginia
1971 establishments in Virginia
NCAA Division I women's soccer teams